Bhimpalasi or Bheempalasi (also known as Bhimpalas or Bheempalas) is a Hindustani classical raga.

Raga Bhimpalasi belongs to the Kafi Thaat.

Theory

Aarohana: 
Avaroha: 

The raag has komal Ni and Ga.
It is an Audava-Sampoorna jati raga, implying that it has 5 notes in Arohana and 7 in Avarohana.

Vadi Swar: 
Samavadi Swar: 
Thaat: Kafi
Pakad or Chalan:

Prominent Bandish(Composition) by Niyamat Khan 'Sadarang'

Sthayi:

Jaa, jaa re apane mandiravaa

Suna paave gi (mori) saas-nanadiyaa

Antara:

Suna ho sadaa-rang, tuma ko chaahata hay

kya tum hamako chalana kiyaa, (or kya tum hamako Thagana diya)

Jaa, jaa re

Prominent Bandish(Composition) by Acharya Dr. Pandit Gokulotsavji Maharaj "MadhurPiya" 
The Bandish Initials(Bandish Name): "Gaao Bajao Sab Mil Ata Umang So"

The Bandish is set in taal EkTaal

Organisation and relationships
Related/similar ragas:
Bageshree, Dhanashree, Dhani, Patdeep, Hamsakinkini, Patdeepaki
In Carnatic music, Karnataka Devagandhari is the most similar raga, falling with Melakarta 22 (Karaharapriya).

Behaviour

The madhyam (fourth) is the most important note - an important 'nyaas' sthaan (note for rest) with emphasized elaboration around this note  - S g M, M g M, g M P, M P g M P (M) g (M) g M...
The rishabh (second) and the dhaivat (sixth) are skipped in aarohi (ascending) passages, but are given due importance when descending (avrohi). Such property of the raga gives it Audava-Sampoorna jati.

Use of the dhaivat and rishabh is symmetric and both are approached via the succeeding notes (D from n, and R from g).g is taken with karn of m, n from sa. 
E.g.-g=mg and n=sn

Film songs

Language: Tamil
Note that the following songs are composed in Abheri, the equivalent of raga Bhimpalasi in Carnatic music.

See also
List of film songs based on ragas

Notes

References

Sources

External links
SAWF Article on Bhimpalasi and related raags
ITC-SRA on Bhimpalasi
SRA on Samay and Ragas
SRA on Ragas and Thaats
Rajan Parrikar on Ragas
Film songs in Bhimpalasi
More details about raga Bhimpalasi

Hindustani ragas